Welcame is the debut studio album by French heavy metal and hardcore punk band Rise of the Northstar. It was released on November 21, 2014 by Nuclear Blast.

Critical reception

Punknews.org praised the first two tracks for displaying the band's mosh-core style and unironic delivery of Japanese pop culture, concluding that, "[I]f you are expecting a groundbreaking, genre-defining release, this is most certainly not it. If you are a fan of all things heavy and want something with a bit of a different spin on what you can bang your head to, then this might be your bag." Garvin Lloyd from Louder Sound commended the album for carrying a junk food quality to their hardcore musicianship and mixing it well with manga iconography, calling it "big, dumb fun at its finest." He concluded that, "While it may make some stomachs turn, the meaty riffs on offer here certainly give you something to get your teeth stuck into." Rock Sound was mixed on the "belligerent, Japanese pop culture-influenced hardcore" style after the first track but said that it will please its existing fanbase more than a casual audience.

Track listing

Personnel
Adapted from the liner notes of Welcame.
Rise of the Northstar
 Vithia – vocals
 Eva-B – lead guitar
 Air One – rhythm guitar
 Fabulous Fab – bass guitar
 Hokuto No Kev – drums

Background vocals
 Pegaz
 Lucas
 Thibault
 Seb
 Julien
 Big Tom
 Marty
 Doom
 Soufiene
 ROTNS

Production
 Zeuss – mixing, mastering

Artwork
 Vithia – art direction, illustration and design
 Berzerker – photography

Charts

References

External links

2014 debut albums
Rise of the Northstar albums
Nuclear Blast albums